Nautilia abyssi is a thermophilic, sulfur-reducing  and strictly anaerobic bacterium from the genus of Nautilia which has been isolated from a hydrothermal chimney from the East Pacific Rise.

References 

Campylobacterota
Bacteria described in 2009